Sigetec Ludbreški  is a village in Croatia. It is connected by the D2 highway.

References

Populated places in Varaždin County